Jan Nečas (born 24 February 1977) is a Czech former football player. He played in the Gambrinus liga for multiple teams and also played in the top flights of Slovakia and Hungary.

References

1977 births
Living people
Czech footballers
Czech expatriate footballers
Association football midfielders
Czech First League players
FC Zbrojovka Brno players
FC Slovan Liberec players
FK Mladá Boleslav players
FC Viktoria Plzeň players
Slovak Super Liga players
AS Trenčín players
FC Nitra players
Nemzeti Bajnokság I players
FC Tatabánya players
Expatriate footballers in Hungary
Footballers from Brno